The 1912–13 Trinity Blue and White's basketball team represented Trinity College (later renamed Duke University) during the 1912–13 men's college basketball season. The head coach was Joseph Brinn, coaching his first season with Trinity. The team finished with an overall record of 11–8.

Schedule

|-

References

Duke Blue Devils men's basketball seasons
Duke
1912 in sports in North Carolina
1913 in sports in North Carolina